Pulau Indah Industrial Park (PIIP) located in Klang District, Selangor, Malaysia is 3,500 acres industrial area which are occupied by business like manufacturing, logistics and warehousing.

References 

Industrial parks in Malaysia